Jud may refer to:

People

People with the surname
 Leo Jud (1482–1542), Swiss reformer
 Jakob Jud (1882–1952), Swiss linguist

People with the nickname or given name
Jud Birchall (1855–1887), American baseball player 
Jud Birza (born 1989), American model
Jud Buechler (born 1968), American basketball player and coach
Jud Daley (1884–1967), American baseball player
Jud Fabian (born 2000), American baseball player
Jud Heathcote (1927–2017), American basketball player and coach
Jud Hurd (1913–2005), American cartoonist
Jud Kinberg (1925–2016), American producer and screenwriter
Jud Larson (1923–1966), American racecar driver
Jud Logan (born 1959), American athlete
Jud McAtee (1920–2011), American ice hockey player
Jud McLaughlin (1912–1964), American baseball player
Jud McMillin (born 1977), American politician
Jud Newborn (born 1952), American author and cultural anthropologist
Jud Simons (1904–1943), Dutch gymnast 
Jud Smith (1869–1947), American baseball player
Jud Strunk (1936–1981), American singer, songwriter and comedian
Jud Taylor (1940–2008), American actor and TV director and producer
Jud Timm (1906–1994), American football player
Jud Tylor (born 1979), Canadian actress
Jud Wilson (1894–1963), American baseball player
Jud Yalkut (1938–2013), film and video maker and intermedia artist

Places 
 Jud, North Dakota, U.S.
 Jud, Texas, U.S.

Other uses
 JUD (Latin: Juris utriusque doctor, Doctor of both laws), a scholar who has acquired a doctorate in both civil and church law
 Jud Fry, a fictional character in Oklahoma!
 Jud Crandall, a fictional character in Pet Sematary
Jud., the Epistle of Jude in the Bible

See also 

 Judd (disambiguation)
 Judah (disambiguation)
 Jud Süß (disambiguation)
 Jute
 Jew
 Yodh or yud, yod, jod, or jodh, a letter of the Semitic abjads, including, Hebrew letter